Gallica, the digital library of the Bibliothèque nationale de France.

Gallica may also refer to:
 Gallic in Latin
 Legio III Gallica, a Roman legion
 Legio XVI Gallica, a Roman legion
 Via Gallica
 Rosa gallica
 Gallica, a kingdom in John Flanagan's book series, The Ranger's Apprentice

See also
 Gallico